Franklin Alexander Carabalí Carabalí (born 27 June 1996) is an Ecuadorian footballer who plays as a defender for Mushuc Runa in Serie A.

References

External links 
 Franklin Carabali | Orlando City Soccer Club Orlando City bio

1996 births
Living people
Footballers from Quito
Ecuadorian footballers
Association football defenders
C.D. Universidad Católica del Ecuador footballers
Orlando City B players
USL League One players
Ecuadorian expatriate footballers
Expatriate soccer players in the United States
Ecuadorian expatriate sportspeople in the United States